Ethnikos Defteras is a Cypriot football club based in Deftera. Founded in 1948, was playing sometimes in Second and sometimes in the Third and Fourth Division.

References

Football clubs in Cyprus
Association football clubs established in 1948
1948 establishments in Cyprus